Barbara Jo Revelle (born 1946) is an American artist known for her public murals and photography. The work features the faces of 168 Coloradans, but no official key to the faces was produced.

Collections
Seattle Art Museum 
Los Angeles Museum of Contemporary Art
Museum of Contemporary Photography 
Center for Creative Photography
Portland Art Museum
Oakland Museum of Contemporary Art

References

1946 births
20th-century American women artists
21st-century American women artists
Living people